This list of bridges in Uruguay lists bridges of particular historical, scenic, architectural or engineering interest. Road and railway bridges, viaducts, aqueducts and footbridges are included.

References

External links

Uruguay

Bridges
Bridges